Late Night Tales: Agnes Obel is a compilation album curated and performed by Agnes Obel for Late Night Tales series, released by Night Time Stories on 25 May 2018. It features artists such as Nina Simone, Henry Mancini, Ray Davies, Michelle Gurevich, Can, and Yello, among many others. Three previously unheard songs from Obel appear in the mix, including “Poem About Death”, a collaboration with the Danish poet Inger Christensen. Critics compared the album with David Lynch's work.

Obel wrote about her album, "I was surprised at how much time I ended up spending on this. I collected all the songs together with my partner Alex and we just spent time listening to records, trying to see what would fit together. Some of the music I’ve included here is on mixtapes we made when we were just friends as teenagers. Each one of the tracks produces stories in my head."

Track listing

References

External links
 Late Night Tales: Agnel Obel at Late Night Tales

Agnes Obel
2018 compilation albums
Agnes Obel albums